Mandisa Williams (born 8 November 1984) is a retired women's rugby union player from Jongilanga, Eastern Cape, South Africa. She played for Imonti Penguins, Border Bulldogs and the South Africa women's national rugby union team as a Number 8.

Career 
Williams started playing rugby for Jogalanga Women, a club founded by her father, in 1999. When she was 16, she was invited to Border Bulldogs trials and was selected for the team to play in the women's Currie Cup. Shortly afterwards she made her international debut for South Africa in 2004. In 2006, she was awarded the South African Rugby Union's Women's player of the year award after playing in South Africa's first women's World Cup campaign at the 2006 Women's Rugby World Cup.

In 2012, Williams was named as captain of the South Africa women's national rugby sevens team for the inaugural IRB Women's Sevens Series. During the 2014 Women's Rugby World Cup, Williams served as captain however after South Africa's first match, she was banned for 16 weeks for eye-gouging and missed the rest of the tournament. She appealed against this but failed to overturn the ban. Williams retired from rugby in 2016.

Personal life 
Williams studied sports management at Walter Sisulu University. Following retirement, she became a sports commentator.

References 

Living people
1984 births
People from the Eastern Cape
South Africa national rugby union team captains
Border Bulldogs players
Women of African descent
South African female rugby union players
South Africa international women's rugby sevens players